Civic Center station is a station of the Blue, Orange, and Silver Lines on the San Diego Trolley. It is located in the Downtown Core of the city and is surrounded by a variety of important office buildings.

This station was closed from May 14 through August 2012 due to renovations related to the Trolley Renewal Project.

Station layout
There are two tracks, each with a side platform. Silver Line heritage service operates Friday through Sunday only.

See also
 List of San Diego Trolley stations

References

Blue Line (San Diego Trolley)
Orange Line (San Diego Trolley)
Silver Line (San Diego Trolley)
Railway stations in the United States opened in 1981
San Diego Trolley stations in San Diego
1981 establishments in California